Terrence Vaughan Mann (born July 1, 1951) is an American theatre, film and television actor and singer. He is best known for his appearances on the Broadway stage, which include Chester Lyman in Barnum, Rum Tum Tugger in Cats, Javert in Les Misérables, The Beast in Beauty and the Beast, Chauvelin in The Scarlet Pimpernel, Charles in Pippin, Mal Beineke in The Addams Family, and The Man in the Yellow Suit in Tuck Everlasting. He has received three Tony Award nominations, an Emmy Award nomination, and an Outer Critics Circle Award for Outstanding Actor in a Musical.  

His film credits include the Critters series, A Chorus Line, Big Top Pee-wee and Solarbabies. He also starred as the villain Whispers in the Netflix series Sense8 from 2015 to 2018. He is a distinguished professor of musical theatre at Western Carolina University, and is an artistic director of the Carolina Arts Festival and the North Carolina Theatre.

Early life
Mann was born in Ashland, Kentucky, the eldest of three sons to Helen and Charles Mann. Mann's mother was a concert pianist, and his father sang in a barbershop quartet. Music was part of his growing up, so singing came naturally to him. But it was the multiple pleasures of the stage that drew him to the world of theater.

In an interview with the Hartford Courant, Mann said: "When I was doing the junior class play — it was called 'In Deadly Earnest' — at the end of a scene, the script said, 'They kiss.' It was then that I honestly thought, 'I'm going to be in the theater!' I was fascinated with having words put in my mouth and that someone would say something back to me that would get us to a moment where we ended up in a kiss. I remember when my school counselor asked me what I wanted to do, I said without hesitation, 'Go into the theater!'"

Mann grew up in Largo, Florida and he is a 1969 graduate of Largo High School. His first professional job came during his college years in Jacksonville University. For $35 a week, he was offered the job of performing in the annual outdoor theater spectacular "The Lost Colony," during summers on the Outer banks of Manteo, North Carolina. It was here he met Joe Layton, who later was instrumental in getting him his first Broadway show.

Mann later attended the North Carolina School of the Arts, where his mentor was Malcolm Morrison, former dean at The Hartt School at the University of Hartford. For many years Mann was a regular at Morrison's North Carolina Shakespeare Festival.

Career

Mann made his Broadway debut in 1980 in Barnum at the St. James Theatre, in the supporting role of Chester Lyman. He made his true break-through performance in the original Broadway cast of Andrew Lloyd Webber's Cats in 1982, in which he met and starred alongside his future wife, Charlotte d'Amboise. He created the memorable lead role of the "playful" cat Rum Tum Tugger. In 1985, Mann played assistant choreographer Larry in Richard Attenborough's film version of A Chorus Line.

In 1987, he played the role of Inspector Javert in the original Broadway cast of Les Misérables. His portrayal of Javert earned him his first Tony Award nomination for Best Actor in a Leading Role, a role which he would later reprise near the end of the musical's run at the Imperial Theatre in 2003. Mann returned to the role once more in June 2015, directing and starring as Javert in a staged concert of the show at the Connecticut Repertory Theatre, Storrs, Connecticut.

Mann earned his second Tony Award nomination for Actor in a Musical in 1994 for his portrayal of the Beast in Disney's Beauty and the Beast at the Palace Theater and reprised his role in the Los Angeles production in 1995 along with many of the original broadway cast members. In 1997, Mann created the role of Chauvelin in the Frank Wildhorn musical The Scarlet Pimpernel on Broadway.

He has also starred in other musicals on Broadway including: Rags (1986), Jerome Robbins' Broadway (1989), Getting Away with Murder (1996) and the 2000 Broadway revival of The Rocky Horror Show (in which he played Frank-N-Furter, replacing Tom Hewitt in the role), in addition to the (then) Off-Broadway musical Assassins (1990) as Czolgosz.
 
He appeared in the first four Critters films as an alien bounty hunter named Ug. He starred in the television soap opera All My Children as Earl Boyd in 1997. Mann played "Old Tom" in Paul Green's outdoor drama The Lost Colony in North Carolina, and later returned to his theatrical roots to direct the show for 2 seasons.

He starred in the Broadway musical Lennon, which opened in August 2005 and closed after 49 performances. He then appeared in the world premiere of The Studio written and directed by his brother-in-law Christopher d'Amboise, at South Coast Repertory, Costa Mesa, California in March 2006.

Mann has made guest appearances on The Equalizer, Gargoyles (voice of Oberon), The Tick (voice), and Law & Order. He was also a leading character on The Dresden Files as Hrothbert "Bob" of Bainbridge, a cursed ghost. He portrayed oceanographer Bob Ballard in the 30 Rock episode "TGS Hates Women".

He appeared in the 2008 films A Circle on the Cross as James Monroe Good, Eavesdrop as August, and the 2009 film The Mandala Maker as Museum Chief Curator. Other films completed include a small role in Jazz in the Diamond District and as Lt. Fox in Red Hook.

In November 2009, he originated the role of Mal Beineke opposite Nathan Lane and Bebe Neuwirth in the Chicago tryout of a musical adaptation of The Addams Family. The show, along with Mann, transferred to Broadway, and opened in March 2010.
 He continued to play the role of Mal Beineke until April 2011, when he, along with several other members of the original cast, left the show.

Mann played King Charles in the American Repertory Theatre (Boston) production of Pippin, from December 2012 to January 2013 a role he first played in the 2004 World AIDS Day Concert. He reprised that role in the Broadway revival for which he received a 2013 Tony nomination for Best Featured Actor in a Musical. He performed alongside his wife, Charlotte d'Amboise, who performed as Fastrada, the King's devious second wife.

In 2015, he took over the role of Charles Frohman/Captain James Hook in the Broadway musical Finding Neverland, replacing Anthony Warlow, who left the show on September 27. He was to remain in the role until Kelsey Grammer's return in January 2016.
 He appeared in the role of "Man in the Yellow Suit" in the Broadway musical Tuck Everlasting in 2016. And he gave a “commanding” performance starring as Edgar Degas in the West Coast premiere of Marie, Dancing Still at Seattle’s 5th Avenue Theatre in 2019.

Personal life
He married his Pippin co-star and wife Charlotte d'Amboise on January 20, 1996. The couple has two daughters, Josephine and Shelby.

Work

Filmography
Sources: TV Guide; TCM

Stage
Sources: Playbill; BroadwayWorld; Internet Broadway Database

Awards and nominations

References

External links
 
 Terrence Mann at the Internet Off-Broadway Database
 
 Terrence Mann – Downstage Center interview at American Theatre Wing
 
 

1951 births
Male actors from Kentucky
American baritones
American male film actors
American male television actors
American male musical theatre actors
20th-century American male actors
21st-century American male actors
Living people
Musicians from Ashland, Kentucky
People from Largo, Florida
University of North Carolina School of the Arts alumni
Jacksonville University alumni
Western Carolina University
Singers from Kentucky